Hua Xin (158 – 30 January 232), courtesy name Ziyu, was a Chinese politician who lived during the late Eastern Han dynasty and Three Kingdoms period of China. He initially served directly under the central government of the Eastern Han dynasty. Later, he served under the warlord Sun Ce and then under the warlord Cao Cao. He continued to serve in the Cao Wei state during the Three Kingdoms period.

Biography
As a clerk in Gaotang County, Hua Xin was nominated as xiaolian, and appointed as Langzhong (郎中). In 187, Hua was appointed as Shangshu Lang (尚书郎). When Dong Zhuo evacuated the court from Luoyang to Chang'an, Hua requested a position as the administrator of Shanggui County (上邽) . He encountered Yuan Shu's army en route and was accepted to the latter's court. However, Hua left after his advice for Yuan to attack Dong Zhuo was dismissed.

In 192, Hua was appointed as the administrator of Yuzhang (豫章) Commandery. After Liu Yao, governor of Yang Province died, his troops were willing to transfer the commandership to Hua. Hua declined, believing it to be inappropriate as an official of the Han. He joined the forces of Sun Ce as the latter was preparing the conquest of Jiangdong. Sun treated him as an honored guest.

In 200, after Sun Ce was assassinated, the imperial court under Cao Cao called Hua back to Luoyang. Sun Quan was hesitant to allow him to go, but Hua convinced Sun that his departure would be a sign of goodwill to Cao Cao. Eventually, Hua replaced Xun Yu as the Shangshu Ling (尚书令, Prefect of the Masters of Writing). In 213, Hua was Junshi (军师, military advisor) in Cao's war against Sun Quan. In August 217, Hua became the first Grandee Secretary (御史大夫) in the Kingdom of Wei, after Cao Cao became Prince of Wei (魏王). In April 220, after Cao Pi became Prince of Wei, Hua became the Chancellor of Wei, and the Marquis of Anle Ting (安乐亭侯).

In late December 220, after Cao Pi crowned himself emperor, Hua was appointed the Minister over the Masses. In 226, Hua was granted the Marquis of Boping (博平侯), and appointed as Grand Commandant. In October 230, after more than a month of slow progress, he sent a memorial to the Imperial Court to oppose Cao Zhen's campaign, resulting in Cao Rui ordering the troops to retreat. Hua Xin died in 232.

Legacy
A famous story of Hua Xin was recorded in A New Account of the Tales of the World:

See also
 Lists of people of the Three Kingdoms

Notes

References

 Chen, Shou (3rd century). Records of the Three Kingdoms (Sanguozhi).
 Pei, Songzhi (5th century). Annotations to Records of the Three Kingdoms (Sanguozhi zhu).

158 births
232 deaths
Cao Wei politicians
Han dynasty politicians from Shandong
Officials under Cao Cao
Politicians from Dezhou
Political office-holders in Jiangxi